Requiem for Romance is the debut studio album by American electronic band Night Club. It was released on October 9, 2016 by Gato Blanco Records. The album's production was handled by Mark Brooks (a.k.a. 3 Kord Scissor King).

Track listing

References

2016 debut albums
Night Club (band) albums